Rogberg is a surname. Notable people with the surname include:

 Carl Rogberg (born 1967), finance director
 Carl Georg Rogberg (1789–1834), Swedish priest
 Christina Rogberg (1832–1907), Swedish author and courtier

See also
 Romberg
 Rosberg